"Hima kimana" is a song by Armenian singer Mihran Tsarukyan. The song was written by Svetlana Bosnoyan, with production handled by the "DUETRO" Studio. The song has created for Armenian sitcom Full House, as the end of season 3. It was released as a single on December 31, 2015, after the last episode of Full House Season 3. It has approximately 10 million views on YouTube.

See also
 Full House (Armenian TV series)

References

External links

2015 singles
Mihran Tsarukyan songs
Dance-pop songs
2015 songs